Juliet Haslam OAM (born 31 May 1969 in Adelaide, South Australia) is a former field hockey defender and midfielder from Australia, who competed in three consecutive Summer Olympics, starting in 1992, for her native country. She was a member of the Australia women's national field hockey team, best known as the Hockeyroos, that won the gold medals at the 1996 and 2000 Summer Olympics. As well as being a dual Olympic Gold Medallist, she won a Commonwealth Games Gold Medal, two World Cup Gold Medals, five Champions Trophy Gold Medals and was named in the Australian Women’s ‘Team of the Century’.

On 26 October 2021, she was appointed as the head of Port Adelaide Power's AFLW operations for their 2023 entry into the AFL Women's competition.

Personal
Juliet lives in Adelaide, South Australia. Her father is Ross Haslam who played 113 games for the Port Adelaide Magpies.

She is married to former footballer Andrew Obst who played for Port Adelaide Football Club in the SANFL (90 games, 4 premierships) and Melbourne Football Club in the AFL. Andrew's family were also Port Adelaide FC stalwarts: father Peter Obst (171 games, 6 premierships), uncle Trevor Obst (200 games, 4 premierships, 1 Magarey Medal) and grandfather Ken Obst (165 games, 3 premierships).

Field Hockey

Club Hockey
Juliet started playing hockey at the age of 10.

State Hockey
She played in junior state and under age Australian teams.

In 1995, Juliet was the Captain of the Australian Hockey League team the Southern Suns that won the national championship.

She is on the South Australian Sports Institute Olympic Games Honour Roll.

International Hockey
Juliet first played for Australia in 1989 and retired after the 2000 Sydney Olympics having played 220 games for Australia. She celebrated her 200th game for Australia in the 1999 Oceania Cup against New Zealand.

She is one of only three South Australians, and one of only 16 females to have played over 200 international games for Australia.

Her achievements include:
Playing in 6 Champions Trophy Tournaments from 1989 - 1999 winning 5 of those tournaments(1991,1993,1995,1997,1999) 
Competing in her first Olympic Games in Barcelona in 1992 and finishing 5th 
1994 - World Cup - Ireland - Gold 
1996 - Olympic Gold medal - Atlanta 
1998 - World Cup - Holland - Gold 
1998 - Commonwealth Games - Kuala Lumpur - Gold (Co-Captain) 
2000 - Olympic Games Gold - Sydney

At the 2000 Olympics, Juliet scored a goal in the gold medal decider in her final match before retiring.

Volunteering
Juliet is actively involved in the community serving in a number of ways. She has been on the Board of Hockey SA since early 2013.

She is an ambassador to the Premier's Reading Challenge, Roger Rasheed foundation which helps give kids a sporting chance, and Port Adelaide Football Club.

Recognition
In 1996, she was named the Telstra's Player's Player Award.

As part of the Australia Day honours in January 1997, Juliet was given the Medal of the Order of Australia (OAM) for service to sport as a Gold Medalist at the Atlanta Olympic Games. Also in 1997, she was awarded SASI Female Athlete of the Year.

In 2000, she was awarded:
SA Great Female Athlete of the Year
SASI Female Athlete of the Year 
SA Great Sports Star of the Year 

In 2004, Juliet was named SA Greatest Ever Hockey Player.

In 2010, Juliet was one of the inaugural inductees to the KPMG South Australian Sport Hall of Fame, a recognition that represents the highest level of recognition and is there to promote the outstanding achievements of the State's greatest athletes and general members.

As a member of the 2000 Sydney Olympic Games gold medal winning Hockeyroos, Juliet was named in the Australian Women’s ‘Team of the Century’ at the 2013 ‘Centenary of Canberra Sportswomen’s Ball’ conducted at The Great Hall, Parliament House in Canberra.

References

External links
 
 Australian Olympic Committee

1969 births
Living people
Australian female field hockey players
Field hockey players at the 1992 Summer Olympics
Field hockey players at the 1996 Summer Olympics
Field hockey players at the 2000 Summer Olympics
Olympic field hockey players of Australia
Olympic gold medalists for Australia
Commonwealth Games gold medallists for Australia
Sportswomen from South Australia
Olympic medalists in field hockey
Field hockey players from Adelaide
Medalists at the 2000 Summer Olympics
Medalists at the 1996 Summer Olympics
Commonwealth Games medallists in field hockey
Field hockey players at the 1998 Commonwealth Games
Recipients of the Medal of the Order of Australia
South Australian Sports Institute alumni
20th-century Australian women
Medallists at the 1998 Commonwealth Games